"Hang in Long Enough" is a single performed by Phil Collins and released in 1990 from the album ...But Seriously. It was the sixth and last single from the album. The song was a moderate hit, reaching the #23 spot on the U.S. Billboard Hot 100 and #34 on the UK Singles Chart but did better in Canada, peaking at #9.

Formats and track listings

CD Maxi
Hang in Long Enough – 4:48
Around the World in 80 Presets – 5:46
Hang in Long Enough (Pettibone 12" Mix) – 7:57

CD Maxi Limited Edition
Hang in Long Enough – 4:47
That's How I Feel – 5:07
Hang in Long Enough (Pettibone Dub Mix) – 6:09

12" single
Side A
Hang in Long Enough (Club Mix) – 7:57

Side B
Hang in Long Enough (Pop Club Mix) – 7:07
Hang in Long Enough (Dub 1) – 5:03

Music video
The video, another one by Collins's frequent collaborators (director) Jim Yukich and (producer) Paul Flattery, sets Phil's modern band on an ill fated Titanic-like liner. It used stock footage from the movie A Night to Remember about the ship's sinking to link it with the song's storyline.

However, the ship is mentioned as the S. S. Udio (a humorous reference to the song "Sussudio") by the host at the start.  Then, the Phenix Horns start playing the initial melody and Collins appears on stage to perform the whole song while the audience becomes shocked by the set design and the musicians' costumes. Throughout the video Collins and the musicians (and the stage they are on) are shown in bright, vivid colour film, while everything else is in black and white - even in the same frame.

Throughout the song, Phil Collins appears to indicate his band to lower their volume. At the second verse of "Hang in Long Enough" the S. S. Udio starts sinking as the band's loud music rattles bolts free and water starts to come into the ship. As the song closes, the band and the audience try to escape to the boats while Collins stays on the stage to end the song with a guitar solo. The ship sinks into the ocean, but Collins and his band escape on a lifeboat - which also has the dog from the "Something Happened on the Way to Heaven" video. Phil laments "I told you, you was playing too loud", then the band sinks his head into the water as they watch the S. S. Udio vanishing.

Charts

Weekly charts

Year-end charts

Credits 
 Phil Collins – keyboards, drums, vocals 
 Daryl Stuermer – guitars
 Dominic Miller – guitars 
 Nathan East – bass 
 The Phenix Horns
 Don Myrick – saxophone
 Louis Satterfield – trombone 
 Harry Kim – trumpet
 Rhamlee Michael Davis – trumpet
 Arranged by Tom Tom 84
 Alex Brown – backing vocals 
 Lynne Fiddmont – backing vocals
 Marva King – backing vocals

References

Specific

1990 singles
Phil Collins songs
Song recordings produced by Hugh Padgham
Song recordings produced by Phil Collins
1989 songs
Atlantic Records singles
Warner Music Group singles
Virgin Records singles